The Canada–Costa Rica Free Trade Agreement (CCRFTA) is a free trade agreement between Costa Rica and Canada. It was signed on April 23, 2001 in Ottawa, Ontario, and came into effect on November 1, 2002. It is the first bilateral free trade agreement to include innovative stand-alone procedures on trade. 87% of all tariffs on agricultural products were eliminated, either immediately, or over a 7-14 year period. Tariffs on many other industries like automotive goods and goods were also eliminated. Several sectors of agriculture were excluded from the treaty; eggs, dairy, poultry and beef being excluded, and Costa Rica decided to leave potatoes out of the FTA. Both nations agreed to use the World Trade Organization rules for sanitary and phytosanitary issues (known as the SPS agreement).

The main goals of the FTA include:
The establishment of free trade
The creation of opportunities for economic development
The elimination of trade barriers
The promotion of fair competition

In the first 3 years of the agreement, trade increased by 36% (from $324 million to $440 million).

It has been proposed that the Free Trade Area of the Americas be modeled after the CCRFTA.

History of trade balances

Amounts in thousands of Canadian dollars.

Negotiations for modernization
There are a number of ongoing negotiations for modernization of the agreement.

References

External links 
  Text of the treaty

Free trade agreements of Canada
Treaties concluded in 2001
Treaties entered into force in 2002
2001 in Canada
2001 in Costa Rica
Treaties of Costa Rica
Canada–Costa Rica relations